Edward Francis Reginald Woolley ARCO (13 May 1895 - 12 January 1954) was a composer and organist based in England.

Life

He was born in Lincoln in 1895, the youngest son of Reginald Smith Woolley and Nora Francis Twentyman. He was educated at Lancing College and was a pupil of Dr. Gray at Trinity College, Cambridge.

He married Florence Elizabeth Dockray in 1915 in London.

Appointments

Assistant organist at Lincoln Cathedral 1926 - 1930 
Organist of St. Mary Magdalene, Newark 1930 - 1954

Compositions

Communion Services and other church music
Hymn tune to Lift up your hearts

References

1895 births
1954 deaths
English organists
British male organists
People educated at Lancing College
Alumni of Trinity College, Cambridge
20th-century English composers
20th-century organists
20th-century British male musicians